The Moorish Queen (Spanish:La reina mora) may refer to:

 The Moorish Queen, a 1903 zarzuela by the Quintero brothers
 The Moorish Queen (1922 film) a Spanish silent film adaptation
 The Moorish Queen (1937 film) a Spanish film adaptation
 The Moorish Queen (1955 film) a Spanish film adaptation